Escalation is a 1968 animated short film, directed by Disney animator Ward Kimball. It is an anti-Vietnam War cartoon mocking U.S. President Lyndon B. Johnson.

Production
The short was made independently from the Disney Studios and is notable for being the only animated cartoon made in this manner by one of Disney's core animators, the "Nine Old Men." Escalation originated from his anger of the "Battle Hymn" during the Vietnam War (a song he performed many times with Firehouse Five Plus Two) and a story from The Realist that suggested that Johnson was preoccupied with the size of his genitals. Kimball had a budget of 3,000 dollars and had to outsource the ink and painting to Celine Miles Ink & Paint, had a college choir sing the "Battle Hymn of the Republic", had to pay an outside camera man to shoot the frames, and finished the film with the help of a friend. 

He showed it at film festivals, college campuses during the U.S. presidential election year in 1968, and personally gave away copies of the film to whoever was interested. The first film festival it was screened at a Los Angeles art house called the Cinema Theatre, proving the film so popular, that it was screened three times there. The film was a runner-up for the Academy Award, but was ultimately dropped due to its content.

In a 2000 interview shortly before his death, Kimball said that he thought that Escalation had not received the mainstream attention it deserved. In 2007, relatives of Kimball put the film online on YouTube.

Plot
The animation begins with a countdown from 10 and a drumbeat, skipping over the number 7 and with each numeral getting larger in size as the countdown progresses. A dove of peace flies upside down and backwards, with X marks over its eyes as if it were dead. Then a giant statue of the head of Lyndon B. Johnson is slowly wheeled into view, while the melody of the "Battle Hymn of the Republic" plays. One of the statue's ears is shaped as a dollar sign. Actor Paul Frees imitates Johnson's voice reading the lyrics, later joined by a choir, with each instance of the word "truth" being bleeped out with a cuckoo sound. As the song goes on, Johnson's nose slowly starts to rise in phallic fashion. When fully erect, the nose begins to shake and then violently explodes as images of the Playboy Bunny, bare breasts, hot dogs, copious amounts of meat, Billy Graham, John Wayne, Doris Day, Coca-Cola, beer, Aunt Jemima, Lassie, Superman, Little Orphan Annie, S&H Green Stamps and cigarettes flash on the screen in rapid succession amidst images and sounds of explosions, followed by a similarly rapid succession of military decoration, ending on the Purple Heart (the medal for those wounded or killed in combat) as a single clock chime is heard. The cartoon fades out by having the statue crack into pieces.

The gradual enlargement of Johnson's nose brings up images of Pinocchio, whose nose grew longer whenever he lied.  Kimball worked on the 1940 Disney adaptation of Pinocchio.

See also
 Mickey Mouse in Vietnam
 Bring Me the Head of Charlie Brown
 Bambi Meets Godzilla

Sources

External links
 
 

1960s American animated films
1968 films
American animated short films
American political comedy films
American satirical films
American animated comedy films
Anti-war films about the Vietnam War
Cultural depictions of Lyndon B. Johnson
Films directed by Ward Kimball
Opposition to United States involvement in the Vietnam War
Vietnam War films
1960s rediscovered films
Rediscovered American films
1960s English-language films